Agnes Rothery (1888–1954), or Agnes Edwards Rothery, was the pen name of American writer Agnes (née Edwards) Pratt. Primarily known as a travel writer, she also published novels.

Rothery died in 1954 in Charlottesville, Virginia. Her papers are at the University of Virginia.

Selected works
 A fitting habitation, 1944
 Family album, 1942
 Miss Coolidge, a comedy in one act, 1927
 Into what port?, illustrations by Carl Burger, 1931
 Images of earth: Guatemala, 1934
 Central American roundabout, illustrated by Kurt Wiese, 1944
 Sweden, the land and the people, 1938
 South America; the west coast and the east, 1930
 Scandinavian roundabout, illustrated by George Gray, 1946
 South American roundabout, illustrated by Carl Burger, 1940
 Central America and the Spanish Main, 1929
 Washington roundabout, illustrated by Carl Burger, 1942
 Virginia, the new dominion, by Agnes Rothery, illustrated by E. H. Suydam, 1940
 New roads in old Virginia, by Agnes Rothery; with illustrations by Alice Acheson, 1929
 Cape Cod, 1918
 A garden rosary, 1917
 The house of friendship, 1915
 Houses Virginians have loved. Illustrated with photos, 1954

References

1888 births
1954 deaths
20th-century American novelists
20th-century American women writers
American travel writers
American women travel writers
20th-century American non-fiction writers
American women novelists